The term  epistemocracy has many conflicting uses, generally designating someone of rank having some epistemic property or other. Nassim Nicholas Taleb used it in 2007 to designate a utopian type of society where the leadership possesses epistemic humility. He claims the French writer Michel de Montaigne was a modern epistemocrat. He points out, however, that it is difficult to assert authority on the basis of one's uncertainty; leaders who are assertive, even if they are incorrect, still gather people together.

However the term had already been used long before this, and  Taleb's usage has not caught on. Most uses of the word are unrelated or even opposite to this. For instance in reference to communism: "Maoism, like the Marxist- Leninist system upon which it modeled itself, was an `epistemocracy,' rule by those possessed of that infallible wisdom embodied in the `universal truth of Marxism'" Or theocracy: "The model for this concentration of knowledge in the hands of a single group is the epistemocracy of the Old Testament priests..."

Another use seems to be in relation to modern science or western technocracy: "...the social promotion and political em-powerment of a new class of experimental scientists ... what sociologists of science like Blumenberg call an epistemocracy." Again this is more or less opposite to Taleb's use. However it would be unfair to say that any of these have exactly caught on either. It remains a word used in an ad hoc manner.

See also 
Skepticism
Empiricism
Steven Connor: A scholar being critical to Epistemocracy

References 

Epistemology
Political neologisms
Skepticism